Holbrook Island Sanctuary is a publicly owned nature preserve with recreational features occupying  on Penobscot Bay in the town of Brooksville, Hancock County, Maine. The site includes upland forest and meadows, wetland marshes and ponds, and rocky mainland shores in addition to off-shore Holbrook Island. The state park is managed by the Maine Department of Agriculture, Conservation and Forestry

History
The park was established in 1971 when Anita Harris donated to the state  of the holdings she had been acquiring in Brooksville since the 1960s. In accordance with Harris's wishes, the park has been maintained in its original state with minimal modern improvements.

Activities and amenities
The park has  of old trails for hiking and cross-country skiing that traverse a variety of coastal habitats. The park also offers swimming, kayaking, and fishing.

References

External links
Holbrook Island Sanctuary Department of Agriculture, Conservation and Forestry
Holbrook Island Sanctuary Guide Department of Agriculture, Conservation and Forestry

Protected areas of Hancock County, Maine
State parks of Maine
Penobscot Bay
Protected areas established in 1971
1971 establishments in Maine